The 1984 South Carolina Gamecocks football team represented the University of South Carolina as an independent during the 1984 NCAA Division I-A football season. Led by second-year head coach Joe Morrison, the 1984 Gamecocks enjoyed a phenomenal and competitive season.  The 1984 squad became the first team in school history to win 10 games (10–2 record) and were ranked as high as No. 2 in the polls before losing to an unranked Navy team 38–21 in the 10th game of the season. The Gamecocks finished No. 11 in the final AP Poll. Along the way, they defeated Georgia, Pittsburgh, Notre Dame, Florida State, and Clemson to earn an appearance in the Gator Bowl against Oklahoma State (21–14 loss). At the time, the No. 11 final ranking was the highest ever achieved by South Carolina. The team was nicknamed "Black Magic" due to their success and their distinctive black jerseys.

Schedule

References

South Carolina
South Carolina Gamecocks football seasons
South Carolina Gamecocks football